The Alien Beats is a band created by Britt Daniel.

Before creating Spoon,  Britt Daniel toyed around with a few musical acts in the Austin area. After his stint with Skellington, fellow KTSB (now KVRX) DJ Brad Shenfeld asked Britt if he would be interested in starting a country/rockabilly band. Britt declined, but then called Brad back a week later and agreed. Britt played bass and Brad  played guitar; they both shared vocal duties. They called the band  The Alien Beats. During a demo recording session drummer Jim Eno was brought in as a fill-in when the original drummer could not make it. Jim soon after became the band's permanent drummer. This association led to the formation of Spoon in the following year.

Releases

Cavin' In
 "Cavin' In" - 3:13
 "Under The Table" - 2:07
 "Time Won't Tell" - 4:28

Notes
Britt Daniel wrote and sang lead for track 2: "Under The Table".

References

Musical groups from Austin, Texas
Musical groups established in 1993
1993 establishments in Texas